is a Japanese actress. She is represented with F Road (Full House Group). Her son is actor Kento Yamaguchi.

Biography
After dropping out from high school, she joined Watanabe Productions.

By the time she was in elementary school, she belonged to the theatre company "Kojika" (her first drama appearance is The Human Condition in the role of a Chinese child).

In 1972, she made her debut in the entertainment world with Zoku Ōoku no Onna-tachi. In April of that year, she debuted her musical career with "Midori no Kisetsu", but soon turned into an actress. She appeared on television dramas such as Zakkyo Jidai and Ōedo Sōsamō.

In 1982, she married a securities company employee. They gave birth to two boys.

On 1 September 2010, she moved to F Road from Office PSC that she belonged to.

Knowing the song "Četri stađuna" sung by Croatian national singer Meri Cetinić, she performed in live shows with her Croatian singing. Through videos published on the Internet, Croatia also gained popularity, and when she visited Croatia in 2011 she was welcomed.

Filmography

Films

TV dramas

Stage

Films (Japanese dub)

Advertisements

Discography

Single records

Albums

See also
List of Japanese actresses

References

External links
 – Ameba Blog 
 – Yaplog! former official blog 

Izumi Yamaguchi on allcinema 
Izumi Yamaguchi on Kinenote 

Izumi Yamaguchi - Movie Walker 
Izumi Yamaguchi (actress) on the TV Drama Database 
 

Japanese idols
Japanese voice actresses
Actresses from Tokyo
1954 births
Living people